C. Moyinkutty (5 August 1943 – 9 November 2020) was an MLA, and the State Vice President of Indian Union Muslim League. He was previously elected to Kerala Legislative Assembly in 1996, 2006 and 2011 from Koduvally (1996-2001) and Thiruvambady (2001-2006; 2011-2016) constituencies. He was the Muthavalli and the President of Andona Mahal Juma Masjid.

Moyinkutty died on 9 November 2020 at the age of 77.

Positions held
 State President and General Secretary of Muslim Youth League
 Kozhikode District Secretary and Treasurer of Muslim League
 Member K.S.R.D.B; Wakf Board
 President of Grama Panchayat, Thamarassery.
 Member of Legislative Assembly  in 1996-2001 (Koduvally constituency)
 Member of Legislative Assembly  in 2001-2006 (Thiruvambady constituency)
 Member of Legislative Assembly  in 2011-2016 (Thiruvambady constituency)
 Member of K.S.R.T.C Adversary board

Personal life
He was the son of Ahamed Kutty Haji and Kunhi Umacha. He was born at Thamarassery on 5 August 1943. He was married to Khadeeja and had three children. His children's names are Ansar M Ahammed, Haseena O, Mubeena.

References

Members of the Kerala Legislative Assembly
Indian Union Muslim League politicians
1943 births
2020 deaths